DZGB (729 AM) is a radio station owned and operated by PBN Broadcasting Network. Its studios are located at the 3rd Floor, Bayona Bldg., Imperial Court Subd. Phase 1, Legazpi, Albay. It operates daily from 4:45 AM to 9:35 PM.

References

Radio stations in Legazpi, Albay
News and talk radio stations in the Philippines
Radio stations established in 1958